Ellen Einan (5 June 1931 – 25 March 2013) was a Norwegian poet and illustrator.

Biography
Ellen Einan was born at Svolvaer in Nordland, Norway, on 5 June 1931.

Einan was known throughout Norway for her compact writing style, mystical vocabulary, vivid imagery, and overall unusual but fascinating poems.
She made her literary debut in 1982 with the poetry collection Den gode engsøster. Among her more notable works included  Søster natt (1985), Døgnfarvene er mørke (1991), De syv nattstegene (1992), Jade for min engel (1994) Innenfor og utenfor er ett (1999) and  Dagen får min uro (2004).  
Several of her books were  illustrated with her own drawings.

She was awarded the Aschehoug Prize in 2002 and the Havmannprisen awarded by Nordland fylkesbibliotek in 2009. In 2012, she received both the Dobloug Prize and the Diktartavla which is awarded jointly by the  Hardanger Folk Museum and the Olav H. Hauge Center.

References

1931 births
2013 deaths
People from Vågan
Norwegian women poets
20th-century Norwegian poets
20th-century Norwegian women writers